The 2012–13 Arizona State Sun Devils men's basketball team represented Arizona State University during the 2012–13 NCAA Division I men's basketball season. The Sun Devils, led by seventh-year head coach Herb Sendek, played their home games at the Wells Fargo Arena and were members of the Pac-12 Conference. They finished the season 22–13, 9–9 in Pac-12 play to finish in a four way tie for sixth place. They lost in the quarterfinals of the Pac-12 tournament to UCLA. They were invited to the 2013 NIT where they defeated Detroit in the first round before losing in the second round to Baylor.

Departures

Recruits

Roster

Depth chart

Schedule

|-
!colspan=9| Regular season

|-
!colspan=9| 2013 Pac-12 tournament

|-
!colspan=9| 2013 NIT

References

Arizona State Sun Devils men's basketball seasons
Arizona State
Arizona State
Arizona State Sun Devils men's basketball team
Arizona State Sun Devils men's basketball team